Sílvio Ferraz (born 1959 in São Paulo) is a Brazilian contemporary composer.

His works have been performed in Brazil and abroad. In 1993 he received two commissions from the British Council when he had the opportunity to work with The Nash Ensemble  and The Smith Quartet. In 1994 two works are performed by Ensemble Contrechamps. His works have also been played by Arditti StringQuartet, Champs d’Action, Iktus Ensemble and Taller de Musica Contemporanea de Chile. Among those ensembles that played his pieces are the Brazilian Grupo Novo Horizonte, Duo Diálogos, Camerata Aberta , Orquestra Municipal de São Paulo, Coral do Estado de São Paulo.

professional background
In 1977 he entered the composition course at the University of São Paulo (USP), where he studied with Gilberto Mendes and Willy Corrêa de Oliveira. After his university studies he followed composition courses with Brian Ferneyhough and James Dillon (1994 at Royaumont Abbey, France) , and Gerard Grisey and Jonathan Harvey (at the IRCAM's "Académie d'été" in 1998).

In 1997 he concluded his doctorate in Music Semiotics at the Pontifical Catholic University of S. Paulo (PUC-SP) with a thesis about the concept of difference and repetition in music according to Gilles Deleuze philosophic thought. In 2006 he passed his habilitation (“Livre Docência”) at the University of Campinas (UNICAMP) with a thesis on compositional techniques.

Since 2014, Full Professor of the Course of Composition at Universidade de São Paulo , and researcher at FAPESP (Fundação de Amparo a Ciência de S.Paulo ) and CNPq (Brazilian National Council for Research). Head of the Music Department for the biennium 2019-2020 and 2021-2022.

Bibliography
 Livro das sonoridades [notas dispersas sobre composição]. Rio de Janeiro: 7 Letras editor. 2004 
 Música e Repetição: aspectos da diferença na música do séc.  XX. S.Paulo: EDUC/Fapesp. 1997
 Notas.Atos.Gestos, Rio de Janeiro : 7 letras. 2007

Sources

 Voix Nouvelle - Rouyaumont Fondation 
 The Nash Ensemble 
 The Smith Quartet 
 Campos do Jordão International Winter Music Festival 
 Escola de Música do Estado de São Paulo 
 Lattes Curriculum: 
 Music Department of Universidade de São Paulo: 
 Musica Brasilis

External links
 Personal Site
 
Enciclopedia Itau
  Interview at VI Canal Contemporâneo
  Silvio Ferraz in BabelScores, publisher, online library
 Biblioteca Virtual (bv) Fapesp
Musicabrasilis

References 

1959 births
Living people
Brazilian composers